Hollybush Hill may refer more than one place in the United Kingdom:

 Hollybush Hill, one of the Malvern Hills along the Herefordshire/Worcestershire border
 Hollybush Hill, Buckinghamshire, hamlet in Stoke Poges parish
 Hollybush Hill, in Lilley parish, Hertfordshire